Nasko Petkov Sirakov (born 26 April 1962) is a Bulgarian retired professional footballer who played mainly as a striker. He is the major shareholder of Levski Sofia.

Part of the Bulgaria national team at the 1994 FIFA World Cup as it finished fourth, he was one of the most important footballers in the country in the 1980s and 1990s, representing Levski Sofia in four separate spells.

Having surpassed the 200-goal mark as a professional – he was crowned the country's top division topscorer four times – Sirakov also worked with his main club in directorial capacities.

Club career
Born in Stara Zagora, the son of professional wrestler Petko Sirakov, Nasko started playing as a striker, playing three games for Levski Sofia's first team in 1980, having joined the club's youth system at the age of 13. In the following years, he developed his game with Spartak Varna and lowly Haskovo, returning to Levski after two seasons (he also played briefly for the latter club in the 1982–83 season).

In his second stint at Levski, Sirakov began appearing regularly, scoring 14 goals in only 19 matches in 1984–85 A Group, as the team won the league. From 1986–88, with the club now renamed Vitosha, he helped to another championship, as well as leading the goal charts in both seasons, scoring 64 goals combined – 36 in just 30 matches in the first year, although the championship was eventually lost to CSKA Sofia, by three points. During this spell, he also won two Bulgarian Cups with the club.

Sirakov moved abroad for the first time in 1988, playing for the following three years in La Liga, with Real Zaragoza and RCD Español. Subsequently, he returned to Levski: in the first season upon his return, he netted 26 times in 27 matches, but the club again lost to CSKA.

In the summer of 1992, the 30-year-old Sirakov signed with Ligue 1 club RC Lens, but returned to his main club in the following transfer window, helping it to three consecutive league wins, whilst being crowned the competition's top scorer on another two occasions. He finished the 1994–95 season with Botev Plovdiv, still contributing decisively in Levski's championship win, scoring 12 in only 10 matches.

Sirakov closed his career at the age of 36, after three years with Slavia Sofia, winning a double in 1995–96 season. During his career in his country, he amassed totals of 294 matches and 196 goals in the top division, the second best achievement after Petar Zhekov; only with his main club, Levski, he scored 165 times in 205 games, a club record.

Sirakov briefly managed Slavia Sofia in 1997. In the following decade, he worked as director of football for Levski, being fired on 7 May 2008, and being succeeded by former club and national teammate Daniel Borimirov.

International career
Sirakov was also a regular for Bulgaria during 13 years, making his debut on 7 August 1983, against Algeria.

He represented the nation at the 1986 FIFA World Cup in Mexico – scoring against Italy in the group stage (1–1) and helping the national team to the round of 16 – and at the 1994 World Cup in the United States: during the latter, as Bulgaria finished in a best-ever fourth position, he played in all the matches, scoring against Argentina for a 2–0 group stage win, also earning penalties against Greece and in the semifinal loss against Italy.

Aged 34, Sirakov was also picked for UEFA Euro 1996 in England, playing the last of his 78 matches (24 goals) on 13 June, against Romania, after replacing Lyuboslav Penev in a 1–0 win.
Immediately after retiring from international play, Sirakov served as assistant to the national team, appearing with it at the 1998 World Cup.

Personal life
Sirakov is married to Iliana Raeva, a distinguished Bulgarian rhythmic gymnast. They have two daughters, named Slaveya and Violeta. His father, the wrestler Petko Sirakov, was the first world champion from Bulgaria.

Career statistics

International

Scores and results list Bulgaria's goal tally first, score column indicates score after each Sirakov goal.

Honours
Levski Sofia
 A Group: 1983–84, 1984–85, 1987–88, 1992–93, 1993–94
 Bulgarian Cup: 1983–84, 1985–86, 1991–92, 1993–94
 Cup of the Soviet Army: 1983–84, 1986–87, 1987–88

Slavia Sofia
 A Group: 1995–96
 Bulgarian Cup: 1995–96

Bulgaria
FIFA World Cup: fourth place 1994

Individual
 A Group top scorer: 1986–87 (36 goals), 1987–88 (28 goals), 1991–92 (26 goals), 1993–94 (30 goals)
 European Golden Shoe third place: 1986–87

References

External links
 Bulgarian Sport Catalog profile 
 
 
 Profile at LevskiSofia.info

1962 births
Living people
Bulgarian footballers
Bulgaria international footballers
Association football forwards
PFC Levski Sofia players
PFC Spartak Varna players
FC Haskovo players
Real Zaragoza players
RCD Espanyol footballers
RC Lens players
Botev Plovdiv players
PFC Slavia Sofia players
First Professional Football League (Bulgaria) players
La Liga players
Ligue 1 players
1986 FIFA World Cup players
1994 FIFA World Cup players
UEFA Euro 1996 players
Bulgarian expatriate footballers
Expatriate footballers in France
Bulgarian expatriate sportspeople in France
Expatriate footballers in Spain
Bulgarian expatriate sportspeople in Spain
Bulgarian football managers
Sportspeople from Stara Zagora
Catalonia international guest footballers